The Celestial Septet is an album by The Nels Cline Singers and Rova Saxophone Quartet which was released in March 2010 on the  New World label.

Reception

The Allmusic review by François Couture awarded the album 4 stars out of 5, stating "a thrilling record, and one of Rova's most artistically successful collaborations... The Celestial Septet features a high level of amalgamation between the two ensembles and, honestly, one wishes for this combination to carry on. Rova and Nels Cline Singers are more than compatible; they complement each other's compositions".

Track listing
All compositions by Larry Ochs except as indicated
 "Cesar Chávez" (Scott Amendola) - 12:46   
 "Trouble Ticket" (Steve Adams) - 12:27   
 "Whose To Know [For Albert Ayler]" - 25:22   
 "Head Count" - 2:21   
 "The Buried Quilt" (Nels Cline) - 15:58

Personnel
The Nels Cline Singers
 Nels Cline – guitar
 Devin Hoff – bass
 Scott Amendola – drums

Rova Saxophone Quartet
 Bruce Ackley - soprano saxophone, tenor saxophone
 Steve Adams - alto saxophone, sopranino saxophone
 Larry Ochs - tenor saxophone, sopranino saxophone
 Jon Raskin - baritone saxophone, alto saxophone, sopranino saxophone

References

2010 albums
Nels Cline Singers albums
Rova Saxophone Quartet albums
New World Records albums
Septets